Rhyssoleptoneta latitarsa is a species of spider in the family Leptonetidae, found in China.

References

Leptonetidae
Spiders of China
Spiders described in 2007